HMCS Clayoquot was a  that served with the Royal Canadian Navy during the Second World War. She saw action mainly in the Battle of the Atlantic. She was sunk in 1944. The minesweeper was named after Clayoquot Sound on Vancouver Island, British Columbia.

Design and description
They came in two versions powered by different engines; those with a diesel engines and those with vertical triple-expansion steam engines. Clayoquot was of the latter design and was larger than her diesel-engined cousins. She had a complement of 6 officers and 77 enlisted.

Clayoquot had two vertical triple-expansion steam engines, each driving one shaft, using steam provided by two Admiralty three-drum boilers.

Clayoquot was armed with a single quick-firing (QF) /40 caliber Mk IV gun mounted forward. For anti-aircraft purposes, the minesweeper was equipped with one QF 2-pounder Mark VIII and two single-mounted QF 20 mm Oerlikon guns. As a convoy escort, Clayoquot was deployed with 40 depth charges launched from two depth charge throwers and four chutes.

Construction and career
Ordered on 23 February 1940 as Esperanza, the ship was renamed Clayoquot in 1940. Clayoquot was laid down on 20 June 1940 by Prince Rupert Dry Dock and Shipyards Co. at Prince Rupert, British Columbia. The minesweeper was launched on 3 October 1940 and commissioned on 22 August 1941 at Prince Rupert.

She left Esquimalt, British Columbia after working up and made her way to Halifax, Nova Scotia where she arrived on 14 November 1941. Clayoquot was made part of Halifax Local Defence Force initially, though she was transferred to the Western Local Escort Force (WLEF) in March 1942. In May 1942 Clayoquot was assigned to the Gulf Escort Force. On 7 July, while responding to a U-boat attack on a convoy in the Gulf of St. Lawrence, Clayoquot came upon the abandoned hulk of the merchant vessel Dinaric, which had been torpedoed during the attack. Clayoquot sank the ship with gunfire and depth charges. On 10 September she was returning to Gaspé, Quebec after escorting a convoy to Rimouski with the corvette  nearby when Charlottetown was hit by two torpedoes. Clayoquot searched for, but was unable to find the submarine. During depth charge attacks on possible targets, Clayoquots radio was knocked out and prevented the ship from informing command of the corvette's loss. She returned to the site of the sinking and was able to rescue 55 survivors, taking at least three and a half hours to complete. In October 1942 she joined Sydney Force.

On 29 December 1942 Clayoquot was sent for a major refit that took her from Halifax to Liverpool, Nova Scotia, to Pictou. The refit was completed in May 1943. After working up, she rejoined Sydney Force. After ten months of training service, she was reassigned to Halifax Force.

Sinking

She sank quickly and eight people died. There had not been enough time to disarm the depth charges kept ready, which detonated as the ship sank causing injuries among the surviving crew, which were picked up by the corvette . The frigate  and sister ship  which had been accompanying Clayoquot, were also targeted by the U-boat, but the torpedoes detonated before doing damage to the ships. A large search force was sent out to deal with the U-boat however they were not successful in finding the submarine.

See also
 List of ships of the Canadian Navy
 History of the Royal Canadian Navy
 Military history of Nova Scotia

References

Notes

Citations

Sources

External links

 
 

Bangor-class minesweepers of the Royal Canadian Navy
Ships built in British Columbia
1941 ships
World War II minesweepers of Canada
Maritime incidents in December 1944
Ships sunk by German submarines in World War II